Pyrgulina is a small genus of very small sea snails, pyramidellid gastropod mollusks or micromollusks. This genus is currently placed in the subfamily Chrysallidinae of the family Odostomiidae.

General description
The whorls of the teleoconch are sculptured similarly throughout. Varices are absent. The shell is marked with strong axial ribs which extend from the summit to the umbilical area The spiral markings consist of impressed lines. The fine, incised spiral striations are subequally spaced and present at the intercostal spaces between the sutures and on the base of the whorls.

Species
Species within the genus Pyrgulina include:

 Pyrgulina adducta Peñas & Rolán, 2017
 Pyrgulina affinis Laseron, 1959
 Pyrgulina altiminima Peñas & Rolán, 2017
 Pyrgulina alveata (A. Adams, 1861)
 Pyrgulina alveatoides (Nomura, 1938)
 Pyrgulina amabilis Saurin, 1959
 Pyrgulina anacra Saurin, 1959
 Pyrgulina angustacostae Peñas & Rolán, 2017
 Pyrgulina anodyna Peñas & Rolán, 2017
 Pyrgulina archetypum Peñas & Rolán, 2017
 Pyrgulina arfica (Bartsch, 1915)
 Pyrgulina arguta Peñas & Rolán, 2017
 Pyrgulina bantama van Aartsen & Corgan, 1996
 Pyrgulina bertae Peñas & Rolán, 2017
 Pyrgulina bifariam Peñas & Rolán, 2017
 Pyrgulina brenda (A. Adams, 1860)
 Pyrgulina buriti Saurin, 1961
 Pyrgulina butoli Saurin, 1961
 Pyrgulina caledonica Peñas & Rolán, 2017
 Pyrgulina calendalis Saurin, 1959
 Pyrgulina cambodgiensis Saurin, 1961
 Pyrgulina canalicia Peñas & Rolán, 2017
 Pyrgulina carbonellae Peñas & Rolán, 2017
 Pyrgulina carmeloi Peñas, Rolán & Sabelli, 2020
 Pyrgulina casta (A. Adams, 1861)
 Pyrgulina cataplexis Peñas & Rolán, 2017
 Pyrgulina cheveyi Saurin, 1959
 Pyrgulina circumducta Peñas & Rolán, 2017
 Pyrgulina clatrorum Peñas & Rolán, 2017
 Pyrgulina collectitia Peñas & Rolán, 2017
  Pyrgulina colligata Peñas & Rolán, 2017
 Pyrgulina columna (Laseron, 1959)
 Pyrgulina comacum Melvill, 1910
 Pyrgulina conciliata Peñas & Rolán, 2017
 Pyrgulina concinna (A. Adams, 1860)
 Pyrgulina condensa Peñas & Rolán, 2017
 Pyrgulina condita Peñas, Rolán & Sabelli, 2020
 Pyrgulina congressa Peñas & Rolán, 2017
 Pyrgulina congruens Peñas & Rolán, 2017
 Pyrgulina consimilis (A. Adams, 1861)
 Pyrgulina consobrina (A. Adams, 1861)
 Pyrgulina corpuslevis Peñas & Rolán, 2017
 Pyrgulina cumstantes Peñas & Rolán, 2017
 Pyrgulina dactyliformis Peñas & Rolán, 2017
 Pyrgulina deambulans Peñas & Rolán, 2017
 Pyrgulina debiliformis Peñas & Rolán, 2017
 Pyrgulina decussata A. Adams, 1863
 Pyrgulina densecostata (Garrett, 1873)
 Pyrgulina diductacostae Peñas & Rolán, 2017
 Pyrgulina difficilis Saurin, 1958
 Pyrgulina diffidenter Peñas & Rolán, 2017
 Pyrgulina dilata Peñas & Rolán, 2017
 Pyrgulina dimidia Peñas & Rolán, 2017
 Pyrgulina dimidiata (Schander, 1994)
 Pyrgulina disposita Peñas & Rolán, 2017
 Pyrgulina dissensionis Peñas & Rolán, 2017
 Pyrgulina dissimiliter Peñas & Rolán, 2017
 Pyrgulina districta Peñas & Rolán, 2017
 Pyrgulina divulgata Peñas & Rolán, 2017
 Pyrgulina dominicae Saurin, 1959
 Pyrgulina dozouli Saurin, 1959
 Pyrgulina ductaspiralis Peñas & Rolán, 2017
 Pyrgulina durabilis van Aartsen & Corgan, 1996
 Pyrgulina eccrita Melvill, 1910
 Pyrgulina edana Melvill, 1910
 Pyrgulina elegantisformae Peñas & Rolán, 2017
 Pyrgulina epentromidea Melvill, 1899
 Pyrgulina epitoniformis Peñas & Rolán, 2017
 Pyrgulina erecta Peñas, Rolán & Sabelli, 2020
 Pyrgulina excellenter Peñas & Rolán, 2017
 Pyrgulina exceptionis Peñas & Rolán, 2017
 Pyrgulina exoleta Peñas & Rolán, 2017
 Pyrgulina fasciesfabae Peñas & Rolán, 2017
 Pyrgulina filocincta (A. Adams, 1863)
 Pyrgulina fischeri Hornung & Mermod, 1925
 Pyrgulina flexicostae Peñas & Rolán, 2017
 Pyrgulina formaviscala Peñas & Rolán, 2017
 Pyrgulina fusiformis Peñas & Rolán, 2017
 Pyrgulina granum Peñas & Rolán, 2017
 Pyrgulina grovesi Peñas & Rolán, 2017
 Pyrgulina hervierioides (Melvill, 1906)
 Pyrgulina honmungensis Saurin, 1959
 Pyrgulina interstriata (Souverbie, 1866)
 Pyrgulina isae Peñas, Rolán & Sabelli, 2020
 Pyrgulina jullieni Dautzenberg, 1912
 Pyrgulina kampotensis Saurin, 1961
 Pyrgulina kempermani (van Aartsen, Gittenberger & Goud, 2000)
 Pyrgulina kepensis Saurin, 1962
 Pyrgulina krempfi Saurin, 1959
 Pyrgulina lacrima Peñas, Rolán & Sabelli, 2020
 Pyrgulina lafollettei Peñas & Rolán, 2017
 Pyrgulina lagoenae Peñas & Rolán, 2017
 Pyrgulina lagrandierei Saurin, 1959
 † Pyrgulina latocorrugata Laws, 1941
 Pyrgulina lecta (Dall & Bartsch, 1906) 
 Pyrgulina levamisii Saurin, 1959
 Pyrgulina lineotuber Peñas, Rolán & Sabelli, 2020
 Pyrgulina linomicalii Peñas, Rolán & Sabelli, 2020
 Pyrgulina maiae Hornung & Mermod, 1924
 Pyrgulina melvilli Dautzenberg & Fischer, 1906
 Pyrgulina microstriata Peñas & Rolán, 2017
 Pyrgulina microtuber Peñas, Rolán & Sabelli, 2020
 Pyrgulina milicha Melvill, 1910
 Pyrgulina minimalicii Peñas & Rolán, 2017
 Pyrgulina minimelata Peñas & Rolán, 2017
 Pyrgulina miniovalis Peñas & Rolán, 2017
 Pyrgulina minuscoronata Peñas & Rolán, 2017
 Pyrgulina minusgranum Peñas, Rolán & Sabelli, 2020
 Pyrgulina minuta Feng, 1996
 Pyrgulina multinodosa Peñas & Rolán, 2017
 Pyrgulina mundula (A. Adams, 1861)
 Pyrgulina nana Hornung & Mermod, 1924
 Pyrgulina nisitugaruensis (Nomura & Hatai, 1940)
 Pyrgulina noviportus Saurin, 1961
 Pyrgulina obesa Dautzenberg, 1912
 Pyrgulina oodes (Watson, 1886)
 Pyrgulina opimasculpta Peñas & Rolán, 2017
 Pyrgulina ovumformis (Nomura, 1938)
 Pyrgulina partimcostae Peñas & Rolán, 2017
 Pyrgulina perdiminuta Peñas & Rolán, 2017
 Pyrgulina permanens Peñas, Rolán & Sabelli, 2020
 Pyrgulina permansa Peñas, Rolán & Sabelli, 2020
 Pyrgulina perscalata (Hedley, 1909)
 Pyrgulina philippinensis Peñas & Rolán, 2017
 Pyrgulina phohaiensis Saurin, 1958
 Pyrgulina pinguis (Peñas & Rolán, 1998)
 Pyrgulina pirinthella Melvill, 1910
 Pyrgulina plicata (A. Adams, 1860)
 Pyrgulina pluricircumversa Peñas & Rolán, 2017
 Pyrgulina problema Peñas & Rolán, 2017
  Pyrgulina pronacostae Peñas & Rolán, 2017
 Pyrgulina propepuncti Peñas & Rolán, 2017
 Pyrgulina prosoribs Peñas, Rolán & Sabelli, 2020
 Pyrgulina proximitatis Peñas & Rolán, 2017
 Pyrgulina pseudalveata  (Nomura, 1936)
 Pyrgulina pulchella (A. Adams, 1860)
 Pyrgulina pupaeformis (Souverbie, 1865)
 Pyrgulina pupula (A. Adams, 1861)
 Pyrgulina pura (A. Adams, 1861)
 Pyrgulina puriae Peñas & Rolán, 2017
 Pyrgulina pyrgomella (Melvill, 1896)
 Pyrgulina quasicylindrica Peñas & Rolán, 2017
 Pyrgulina quinqueflexaPeñas, Rolán & Sabelli, 2020
 Pyrgulina raricostae Peñas & Rolán, 2017
 Pyrgulina rectangularis Peñas & Rolán, 2017
 Pyrgulina redempta (Melvill, 1910)
 Pyrgulina reekmansae Peñas, Rolán & Swinnen, 2014
 Pyrgulina robustissima Peñas & Rolán, 2017
 Pyrgulina rudicostae Peñas & Rolán, 2017
 Pyrgulina santaisabelensis Peñas & Rolán, 2017
 Pyrgulina satistriata Peñas & Rolán, 2017
 Pyrgulina scabra Peñas, Rolán & Sabelli, 2020
  Pyrgulina scapulata Peñas & Rolán, 2017
 Pyrgulina scripta van Aartsen & Corgan, 1996
 Pyrgulina shigeyasui (Yokoyama, 1927)
 Pyrgulina simokitana (Nomura, 1939)
 Pyrgulina sowerbyi van Aartsen & Corgan, 1996
 Pyrgulina spifunifortis Peñas & Rolán, 2017
 Pyrgulina spissa Laseron, 1959
 Pyrgulina standeni Dautzenberg & Fischer, 1906
 Pyrgulina sykesi Dautzenberg & Fischer, 1906
 Pyrgulina taravaensis Peñas & Rolán, 2017
 Pyrgulina tenerrima (Melvill, 1907)
 Pyrgulina textilisculpta Peñas & Rolán, 2017
 Pyrgulina thelxinoa (Melvill, 1906)
 Pyrgulina tongaensis Peñas & Rolán, 2017
 Pyrgulina traiecta Peñas & Rolán, 2017
 Pyrgulina trochiformis Saurin, 1959
 Pyrgulina tutubaensis Peñas & Rolán, 2017
 Pyrgulina vanderlindeni (van Aartsen, Gittenberger & Goud, 2000)
 Pyrgulina vanvelthoveni Peñas, Rolán & Swinnen, 2014
 Pyrgulina ventricosa Hornung & Mermod, 1924
 Pyrgulina venuste Peñas & Rolán, 2017
 Pyrgulina verticalis Peñas & Rolán, 2017
 Pyrgulina whitechurchi (W.H. Turton, 1932)
 Pyrgulina yersini Saurin, 1959
 Pyrgulina zidora Melvill, 1910

Species brought into synonymy 
 Pyrgulina abbreviata Monterosato, 1884: synonym of Turbonilla amoena (Monterosato, 1878)
 Pyrgulina angulosa Monterosato, 1889: synonym of Parthenina angulosa (Monterosato, 1889)
 Pyrgulina approximans Dautzenberg, 1912: synonym of Kongsrudia approximans (Dautzenberg, 1912)
 Pyrgulina bavayi Dautzenberg, 1912: synonym of Kongsrudia gruveli (Dautzenberg, 1910)
 Pyrgulina bartschi Dautzenberg & Fischer, 1906: synonym of Egilina callista (Melvill, 1893)
 Pyrgulina bavayi Dautzenberg, 1912: synonym of Kongsrudia gruveli (Dautzenberg, 1910)
 Pyrgulina brevicula Monterosato, 1884: synonym of Chrysallida monterosatii (Clessin, 1900): synonym of Parthenina monterosatii (Clessin, 1900)
 Pyrgulina brusinai Cossmann, 1921: synonym of  Chrysallida incerta (Milaschewitsch, 1916)
 Pyrgulina callista Mevill, 1893: synonym of Egilina callista (Melvill, 1893)
 Pyrgulina claudoni Dautzenberg & Fischer, 1906: synonym of Numaegilina claudoni (Dautzenberg & Fischer, 1906)
 Pyrgulina connexa Dautzenberg, 1912: synonym of  Chrysallida connexa (Dautzenberg, 1912)
 Pyrgulina cossmanni Hornung & Mermod, 1924: synonym of Besla cossmanni (Hornung & Mermod, 1924)
 Pyrgulina costulata (Dunker, 1860): synonym of Pyrgulina pupaeformis (Souverbie, 1865)
 Pyrgulina crystallopecta Melvill, 1910: synonym of Pyrgiscus crystallopectus (Melvill, 1910)
 Pyrgulina dautzenbergi Melvill, 1910: synonym of Polemicella dautzenbergi (Melvill, 1910) (original combination)
 Pyrgulina decorata (Philippi, 1849): synonym of Chrysallida decorata (Philippi, 1849)
 Pyrgulina denticula Coen, 1933: synonym of Chrysallida terebellum (Philippi, 1844): synonym of Parthenina terebellum (Philippi, 1844)
 Pyrgulina edgarii Melvill, 1896: synonym of Turbonilla edgarii (Melvill, 1896))
 Pyrgulina epentroma (Melvill, 1896)): synonym of Costabieta epentroma (Melvill, 1896))
 Pyrgulina fannyae Saurin, 1959: synonym of Linopyrga fannyae (Saurin, 1959)
 Pyrgulina feriarum Saurin, 1959: synonym of Linopyrga feriarum (Saurin, 1959)
 Pyrgulina gemmifera Dautzenberg & H. Fischer, 1906: synonym of Liamorpha gemmifera (Dautzenberg & H. Fischer, 1906)
 Pyrgulina germaini Dautzenberg & Fischer, 1906: synonym of Odostomella germaini (Dautzenberg & Fischer, 1906)
 Pyrgulina germaini Dautzenberg, 1912: synonym of Pyrgulina substituta Dautzenberg, 1913
 Pyrgulina givenchyi Dautzenberg, 1912: synonym of  Chrysallida jullieni (Dautzenberg, 1912)
 Pyrgulina gliriella Melvill & Standen, 1896: synonym of  Herviera gliriella (Melvill & Standen, 1896)
 Pyrgulina humilis (Preston, 1905): synonym of Quirella humilis (Preston, 1905)
 Pyrgulina indistincta (Montagu, 1808): synonym of Parthenina indistincta (Montagu, 1808)
 Pyrgulina infrasulcata Dautzenberg, 1912: synonym of Odetta sulcata (de Folin, 1870)
 Pyrgulina lamyi Dautzenberg, 1912 : synonym of  Pyrgulina mutata Dautzenberg, 1912
 Pyrgulina lamyi Dautzenberg & Fischer, 1906: synonym of Egilina lamyi (Dautzenberg & Fischer, 1906)
 Pyrgulina manorae (Melvill, 1898): synonym of Turbonilla manorae Melvill, 1898: synonym of Turbonilla mumia (A. Adams, 1861)
 Pyrgulina monicae Saurin, 1958: synonym of Parthenina monicae (Saurin, 1958)
 Pyrgulina montbruni Saurin, 1959: synonym of Pyrgulina pupaeformis (Souverbie, 1865) (doubyful synonym)
 Pyrgulina muinamensis Saurin, 1959: synonym of Pyrgulina pupaeformis (Souverbie, 1865)
 Pyrgulina mutata Dautzenberg, 1912: synonym of  Kongsrudia mutata (Dautzenberg, 1912)
 Pyrgulina nigraerupis Saurin, 1959 : synonym of Pyrgulina tenerrima (Melvill, 1906)
 Pyrgulina perscalata (Hedley, 1909): synonym of Linopyrga perscalata (Hedley, 1909)
 Pyrgulina perspectiva Hedley, 1902: synonym of Egilina callista (Melvill, 1893)
 Pyrgulina polemica Melvill, 1910: synonym of Polemicella polemica (Melvill, 1910)
 Pyrgulina prestoni Dautzenberg & Fischer, 1906: synonym of Egilina prestoni (Dautzenberg & Fischer, 1906)
 Pyrgulina pretiosa Dautzenberg & Fischer, 1906: synonym of Miralda pretiosa (Dautzenberg & Fischer, 1906)
 Pyrgulina pretiosa (Turton, 1932): synonym of Pyrgulina sowerbyi van Aartsen & Corgan, 1996 (secondary junior homonym of Pyrgulina pretiosa Dautzenberg & Fischer, 1907; Pyrgulina sowerbyi is a replacement name.)
 Pyrgulina primitractus Saurin, 1959: synonym of Linopyrga primitractus (Saurin, 1959)
 Pyrgulina pura Saurin, 1961: synonym of Chrysallida pura (Saurin, 1962)
 Pyrgulina pygmaea Thiele, 1925: synonym of Pyrgulina bantama van Aartsen & Corgan, 1996
 Pyrgulina sculptatissima Dautzenberg, 1912: synonym of Miralda elegans (de Folin, 1870): synonym of Liamorpha elegans (de Folin, 1870)
 Pyrgulina sinus Saurin, 1959: synonym of Linopyrga sinus (Saurin, 1959)
 Pyrgulina senex Hedley, 1902: synonym of Miralda senex (Hedley, 1902) (original combination)
 Pyrgulina sowerbyi van Aartsen & Corgan, 1996: synonym of Pyrgulina pretiosa (Turton, 1932)

References

External links 
 To World Register of Marine Species

Pyramidellidae